Shadow Knight (Randall Spector) is a supervillain appearing in American comic books published by Marvel Comics, commonly as an adversary of his brother, the superhero Moon Knight.

A young Randall makes his live-action debut in the Marvel Cinematic Universe television miniseries Moon Knight, played by Claudio Fabian Contreras.

Publication history 

Randall Spector was introduced in the "backup feature" of Hulk! Magazine #17 in October 1979 as a mysterious serial killer known as the Hatchet-Man who murders nurses around New York City. Moon Knight attempts to stop the murders and eventually deduces that the killer is his estranged brother Randall. In #18, Moon Knight confronts his brother in Central Park and a fight ensues in which Randall is killed. This was later retconned by writer Howard Mackie to be an impostor, and in Marc Spector: Moon Knight #33 and #35–38, Randall returns. During the Shadowland crossover, writer Gregg Hurwitz and artist Ron Garney wrote a three issue limited series where Moon Knight deals with his brother in a final confrontation. This is also the first time Randall is referred to as Marc's younger brother; in all previous appearances, it has been clearly stated that Randall is the older sibling.

Fictional character biography 
Randall Spector was born in Chicago, Illinois, and is the son of Elias Spector, a rabbi who survived Nazi persecution. Randall and Marc are brothers, and at times both have been cast as the avatars of the Egyptian moon god Khonshu. Randall Spector grew up with his brother Marc, playing army games with him. He followed his brother into the Marine Corps, and eventually they both became mercenaries in northern Italy. It was later discovered that Randall killed Marc's then-nurse girlfriend. Marc chased his brother until there was a confrontation. Marc threw a grenade at Randall's sniper position, thinking he killed him, but then Randall returns to New York on a murder spree focused on killing nurses with a hatchet. Moon Knight uses his girlfriend Marlene as bait, but he can't stop  being stabbed. He swears revenge but cannot kill his brother. Randall then jumps at Marc, but he dodges; however, Randall impales himself in a tree branch.

It is later revealed that the person killed was not Randall but an impostor with implanted memories. Randall is actually a member of the Cult of Khonshu, having been mystically enhanced with impenetrable skin and superhuman strength by Princess Nephthys.

During the Shadowland storyline, Randall mysteriously re-emerged as the Shadow Knight, convinced by The Profile that he is the next Khonshu avatar on Earth. Sharing essentially all of the Moon Knight's powers, except that he can emit a radioactive blast from his eyes, the two are almost evenly matched. Randall attacks Moon Knight's pregnant girlfriend, Marlene. The two eventually meet up in New Orleans following the mysterious Sapphire Crescent. Randall ends up using a hostage as a shield with a bomb, and Moon Knight is out of throwing crescents; however, Moon Knight launches the Sapphire Crescent and kills his brother.

The Shadow Knight made his return in Strange #4 as a revenant, under the direction of the Blasphemy Cartel, enemies of Clea Strange. His body was taken over by rebellious dead souls that reanimated it and fought Clea Strange and her mother, the warlord Umar.

Powers and abilities 
Nepthys' "lunar treatments" granted him superhuman strength and external durability, although his internal organs were like those of a normal human's. Randall Spector possessed extensive training in espionage and military combat tactics. However, he was barely able to access these skills after becoming insane.

Equipment 
As the Hatchet-Man, he used an off-the-shelf Halloween mask to hide his face.

As Shadow Knight, he wore Kevlar body armor for further protection.

Weapons 
Wooden-handled hatchet.

In other media 
A young Randall Spector appears in flashbacks in the Marvel Cinematic Universe / Disney+ miniseries Moon Knight episode "Asylum", portrayed by Claudio Fabian Contreras. This version died in a flooded cave that he and his older brother Marc found. As the latter survived, their embittered mother Wendy blamed him for Randall's death, which caused her to become abusive towards Marc, who consequently developed dissociative identity disorder and created Steven Grant to protect himself from her.

References

External links 
 Randall Spector at Marvel Wiki

Characters created by Bill Sienkiewicz
Characters created by Doug Moench
Comics characters introduced in 1979
Fictional American Jews in comics
Fictional characters from Chicago
Fictional mercenaries in comics
Fictional serial killers
Marvel Comics characters with superhuman strength
Marvel Comics male supervillains
Marvel Comics military personnel
Marvel Comics supervillains